Der Springteufel is a 1974 West German TV movie starring Dieter Hallervorden and Arno Assmann, directed by Heinz Schirk. It is a remake of the British television play Yob and Nabob (1965, in the anthology series Theatre 625), written by Derrick Sherwin, an English television writer best known for his work in Doctor Who. It is a psychological thriller about a hitchhiker to Frankfurt who takes the man who gives him a lift hostage and plays mind games with him. It was released on DVD in 2006.

Cast 
 Arno Assmann – Driver
 Dieter Hallervorden – Hitchhiker
 Hanna Seiffert
 Klaus Dieter Söder
 Manfred Böhm
 Hans Weverinck
 Hans Diener

External links 
 
 (de) Review from fernsehkritik.tv

1974 films
1974 television films
1970s thriller films
German thriller films
West German films
1970s German-language films
German-language television shows
German television films
Films about hitchhiking
1970s German films
Das Erste original programming